The Simca Vedette is a large car, manufactured from 1954 to 1961 by French automaker Simca, at their factory in Poissy, France. The Vedette competed in France's large car market at a time when the economy was finally returning to growth, and enjoyed moderate success with its American style finished off by the Italian designer Rapi. It was marketed with different model names according to trim and equipment levels. The Vedette was Simca's largest model at that time and it spawned a more economical version, the Simca Ariane.

Simca acquired the Poissy factory from Ford France (Ford Société Anonyme Française, the French subsidiary of the Ford Motor Company), along with the model line, in 1954. The Vedette was therefore initially still marketed as the Ford Vedette.

The Vedette was manufactured in Poissy until 1961 and the Ariane until 1963. After that, production continued in Brazil until 1966, when the Vedette finally evolved into the Simca Esplanada following Simca's takeover by Chrysler.

Origins and launch
In the early 1950s, Henri Théodore Pigozzi was looking to expand the manufacturing operations of his Simca company, which was enjoying much success at the time, thanks to the popular Aronde. At the same time, Ford was seeking to divest itself of its French subsidiary, Ford SAF, which had a factory in Poissy, close to Paris, where it had been manufacturing a large car called the Ford Vedette. The Poissy plant was large and there was capacity for further expansion. The Vedette was a larger car than anything that Simca had on offer at that time. These points attracted Pigozzi, who decided to take over the entire factory, along with the rights to the cars manufactured there.

The cars appeared at the Paris Motor Show in October 1954 on the Ford France stand, but there was no mention of the Ford name on the covers of the brochures offered to potential customers.   The name "Ford" appeared just once, in very small print, on the final page, presumably in order to avoid confusing customers who would be expected to call the cars "Simcas" from 1 December 1954, the date set for the formal hand-over of the  business.   In export markets the name change was less immediate, and even in adjacent Belgium, in January 1955 at the Brussels Motor Show the cars were still appearing on the stand of the Belgian Ford importer, sharing the space with models imported from Ford of Britain.

First generation

The acquisition by Pigozzi took place in July 1954, just when Ford was poised to launch its new, modern Vedette, with a four-door saloon body of "American" style, much like the contemporary British Fords or Vauxhalls. The car was powered by an unusually small 2351 cc sidevalve V8 engine called Aquilon ("North wind") in France, derived from Ford's Flathead engine family, whose displacement positioned the car into the "13 CV" French tax class. Equipped with a two-barrel Zenith-Stromberg 32NX carburetor, it produced  for the first generation. Power was transferred to the rear live axle through a three-speed manual transmission with column shift. The Vedette had independent front suspension (by MacPherson struts) and drum brakes on all four wheels.

As with the Aronde, Simca marketed different trim levels of the Vedette under different model names, this time with references to the grand period of baroque in French history. The basic version was called the Simca Vedette Trianon, the mid-level was the Simca Vedette Versailles and, at the top of the range, the Simca Vedette Régence. An option on all versions was a large glass moonroof that slid into the roof, called Vistadome The Vedette range was still marketed under the Ford brand in some markets, including the Netherlands and Germany, until 1956. As the new model caught on, Simca was able to increase production from the 150 daily achieved during Ford's ownership of the factory to 250 cars a day.

Pigozzi maintained a schedule of year-to-year model revisions, much like US manufacturers. For 1956, an estate version called the Simca Vedette Marly joined the line-up and the whole range was revised. A new license plate holder was added to the front bumper and the rear license plate now concealed the fuel tank filler. A peculiar addition was a pedal-operated windscreen washer, while other more ordinary changes included a second odometer, also known as a 'trip meter', for measuring partial distances. The Versailles and Régence were made even more comfortable with the addition of central armrests (Versailles in the rear only, Régence in front and rear), while the Trianon was simplified, losing bumper guards and chrome windscreen decor. In 1957, an option of the Gravina automatic clutch was added, along with better brakes and more direct steering. The Trianon regained the chrome decor around the windscreen, while the other models acquired slimmer tail lights and the front ornament was replaced with a new design. Fender-mounted V8 badges were introduced but, although the whole range featured the same V8 engine, the new badges appeared on the fenders of only the Régence and Marly.

Production figures
1955 – 42,439
1956 – 44,836
1957 – 17,875

Second generation

After three years in production, the Vedettes were given new names and a new, elongated body, with a more ornate front end and large tailfins, making the cars even more American-looking than before. This was part of a styling trend shown by most large European cars of that period, which were, to some extent, inspired by American styling, as tailfins appeared on Peugeots, Fiats, BMC models (Pinin Farina-styled), Fords and even Mercedes-Benz cars of that era. Using the new body, the Versailles was replaced by Simca Vedette Beaulieu and the Régence by the Chambord, while the estate retained the Vedette Marly name.

The three-year-old body of the previous Vedette nevertheless continued in production but it lost its V8 2.4-litre engine. In April 1957, fitted with the 1.3 L Aronde engine, the old body now clothed a new model in the Simca range, the Simca Ariane. Later, in October 1957, a V8 version of the old bodied car, with the Aquillon 84 engine, and badged as the Ariane 8, joined the range, replacing the Trianon.

1959 brought a new option, the Rush-Matic automatic transmission, which featured two modes: Rush (fully automatic) and Road (manual gear selection). The same year, assembly of the Vedette started at Simca do Brasil. Also during 1959, a new top-of-the-line model joined the Vedette range, the Présidence, featuring a luxurious interior, a radiotelephone (a European first) and a continental kit. French coachbuilder Chapron built two 2-door Présidence convertibles for a governor of one of the French colonies. Chapron had another order the next year, to build two four-door convertibles for the French President Charles de Gaulle. The Beaulieu was dropped in autumn 1960, but the other models remained unchanged until the 1961 model year, when they received new seats, new chrome decor, and the engine was fitted with a new anti-vibration crankshaft.

French production of the V8-engined cars ended in the summer of 1961, by when 173,288 had been produced, although a Simca Chambord was exhibited at the Paris Motor Show in October of that year, suggesting that Simca still had some stock of the cars to clear.   The small-engined 4-cylinder Ariane, of which 166,363 were produced, survived until 1963.

The model was continued for longer in Brazil, where the Ford-sourced Aquilon 2.4-litre V8 engine underwent a number of improvements, first increasing power to 100 hp (the Tufão version), then to 140 hp (called Emi-Sul due to its hemispherical combustion chambers, as used in Chrysler's Hemi engines). Trim levels included the Présidence as the top-end model, Chambord as the mainstream model and the Alvorada, later renamed Profissional, as a base model, mainly marketed towards taxi drivers. There was also the Jangada station wagon, based on the Marly. It was eventually replaced by a version with new sheetmetal, called the Simca Esplanada.

Production figures
1958 – 28,142
1959 – 15,966
1960 – 13,914
1961 – 3,813

Models (Brazilian market)
Chambord - 42,910
Présidence - 848 
Rallye - 3,992
Jangada - 2,705
Alvorada - 378 
Total: 50,833

Australian production
Following an announcement in July 1959 that it would assemble and market Simca models in Australia, Chrysler Australia produced the Vedette Beaulieu through to 1962, using both fully imported and locally sourced components.

References

External links
Swedish Vedette Club

Vedette
Sedans
Station wagons
Convertibles
Cars introduced in 1954
1960s cars
Rear-wheel-drive vehicles
Poissy